Westbank is one of the communities within the City of West Kelowna in the province of British Columbia. It is 12 km to the west of Kelowna. Other communities in West Kelowna include Casa Loma, West Kelowna Estates, Shannon Lake, Smith Creek, Glenrosa, Rose Valley and Lakeview Heights. Westbank sits to the south of West Kelowna.

Westbank was for many years an unincorporated area within the Central Okanagan Regional District. In December 2007, following a governance referendum, it became a neighborhood within what is now the City of West Kelowna. It has no legal borders since it is a neighborhood and opinions vary as to exactly where Westbank begins and ends. As of January 2020, the City of West Kelowna has a total population of about 35,818.

A post office was opened in 1902 and was named for its location on Okanagan Lake. The name was suggested by John Davidson who arrived in the district in 1892.

Self-Government municipal regulatory powers have been given by treaty to the Westbank First Nation (WFN). Westbank First Nation spans 5,340 acres of Reservation land, separated into five land parcels.

Local attractions
The Westbank area has numerous orchards, wineries, golf courses, and is a twenty-minute drive from the former Crystal Mountain Ski Resort. To the south of Westbank are the towns of Peachland and Summerland, and the city of Penticton.

Recreation 

There are three public beach accesses along Okanagan Lake. 

There are four public launches into the Okanagan Lake.

References

External links
 Westbank Chamber of Commerce

West Kelowna
Designated places in British Columbia
Populated places on Okanagan Lake